Yasser Abdel Rahman Sakr (born December 1, 1977) is an amateur Egyptian Greco-Roman wrestler, who played for the men's super heavyweight category. He won a bronze medal for his category at the 2005 Mediterranean Games in Almería, Spain.

Sakr represented Egypt at the 2008 Summer Olympics in Beijing, where he competed for the men's 120 kg class. He received a bye for the preliminary round of sixteen, before losing out to Armenia's Yury Patrikeyev, with a two-set technical score (1–5, 0–7), and a classification point score of 1–3.

References

External links
Profile – International Wrestling Database
NBC 2008 Olympics profile

1977 births
Living people
Olympic wrestlers of Egypt
Wrestlers at the 2008 Summer Olympics
Egyptian male sport wrestlers
Mediterranean Games bronze medalists for Egypt
Competitors at the 2005 Mediterranean Games
Mediterranean Games medalists in wrestling
20th-century Egyptian people
21st-century Egyptian people